Stephan Stracke (born 1 April 1974) is a German lawyer and politician of the Christian Social Union (CSU) who has been serving as a member of the Bundestag from the state of Bavaria since 2009.

Political career 
Stracke first became a member of the Bundestag in the 2009 German federal election, elected with a mandate in Oberallgäu. He is a member of the Committee for Labour and Social Affairs.

In the negotiations to form a coalition government following the 2013 federal elections, Stracke was part of the CDU/CSU delegation in the working group on health policy, led by Jens Spahn and Karl Lauterbach.

In April 2021, Stracke succeeded Georg Nüßlein as deputy chair of the CDU/CSU parliamentary group, under the leadership of chairman Ralph Brinkhaus.

Other activities 
 Deutsche Renten Information (DRI), Member of the Advisory Board

Political positions 
In June 2017, Stracke voted against Germany's introduction of same-sex marriage.

References

External links 

  
 Bundestag biography 

1974 births
Living people
Members of the Bundestag for Bavaria
Members of the Bundestag 2021–2025
Members of the Bundestag 2017–2021
Members of the Bundestag 2013–2017
Members of the Bundestag 2009–2013
People from Marktoberdorf
Members of the Bundestag for the Christian Social Union in Bavaria